Joël Germain (born 7 December 1964) is a retired French football defender.

References

1964 births
Living people
French footballers
Racing Besançon players
Louhans-Cuiseaux FC players
US Orléans players
Stade Malherbe Caen players
Lille OSC players
Stade de Reims players
Association football defenders
Ligue 1 players